Taldou District is a district of the Homs Governorate in central Syria. Administrative centre is the town of Taldou. The Northwestern Quadrant of the District is within Wadi al-Nasara, an Antiochian Greek Orthodox population region and cultural area. Krak Des Chevaliers, a famous Crusader Castle, is in the northwesternmost edge of the district.

The district was formed in 2010 from three sub-districts formerly belonging to Homs District. At the 2004 census, these sub-districts had a total population of 90,139.

Sub-districts
The district of Taldou is divided into three sub-districts or nawāḥī (population as of 2004):
Taldou Subdistrict (ناحية تلدو): population 71,503.
Kafr Laha Subdistrict (ناحية كفرلاها): population 20,041.
Al-Qabu Subdistrict (ناحية القبو): population 18,636.

References

Districts of Homs Governorate
2010 establishments in Syria